Lawrenceburg is a city in Dearborn County, Indiana, United States. The population was 5,042 at the 2010 census. The city is the county seat and largest city of Dearborn County. Lawrenceburg is in southeast Indiana, on the Ohio River west of Cincinnati.

History
Founded in 1802, Lawrenceburg was named for the maiden name of the wife of founder Samuel C. Vance.

In the 19th century, Lawrenceburg became an important trading center for riverboats on the Ohio River.

The Dearborn County Courthouse, Downtown Lawrenceburg Historic District, Hamline Chapel United Methodist Church, the Liberty Theatre, the Dunn Home, The Daniel S. Major House, and Vance-Tousey House are listed on the National Register of Historic Places.

Geography
Lawrenceburg is located at  (39.096015, -84.857783).

The City of Lawrenceburg is located in the Ohio River Valley and is situated on the banks of the Ohio River. Lawrenceburg is located on the west-side of the Greater Cincinnati, Ohio tri-state metro area.

Demographics

2010 census
As of the census of 2010, there were 5,042 people, 2,057 households, and 1,142 families living in the city. The racial makeup of the city was 93.5% White, 3.0% African American, 0.3% Native American, 0.8% Asian, 0.3% from other races, and 2.2% from two or more races. Hispanic or Latino of any race were 1.2% of the population.

There were 2,057 households, of which 31.3% had children under the age of 18 living with them, 31.4% were married couples living together, 17.8% had a female householder with no husband present, 6.3% had a male householder with no wife present, and 44.5% were non-families. 39.1% of all households were made up of individuals, and 13.5% had someone living alone who was 65 years of age or older. The average household size was 2.26 and the average family size was 2.96.

The median age in the city was 35.5 years. 24.1% of residents were under the age of 18; 10.6% were between the ages of 18 and 24; 26.6% were from 25 to 44; 24.1% were from 45 to 64; and 14.7% were 65 years of age or older. The gender makeup of the city was 49.0% male and 51.0% female.

2000 census
As of the census of 2000, there were 4,685 people, 1,914 households, and 1,140 families living in the city. The racial makeup of the city was 93.81% White The two largest ethnic groups in Lawrenceburg and Lawrenceburg Township are 29% German Americans, and 19% Irish Americans, 4.18% African American, 0.15% Native American, 0.45% Asian, 0.04% Pacific Islander, 0.32% from other races, and 1.05% from two or more races. Hispanic or Latino of any race were 0.85% of the population.

There were 1,914 households, of which 31.0% had children under the age of 18 living with them, 36.2% were married couples living together, 18.4% had a female householder with no husband present, and 40.4% were non-families. 34.4% of all households were made up of individuals, and 13.5% had someone living alone who was 65 years of age or older. The average household size was 2.28 and the average family size was 2.94.

In the city, the population was spread out, with 24.2% under the age of 18, 11.5% from 18 to 24, 28.3% from 25 to 44, 20.1% from 45 to 64, and 15.8% who were 65 years of age or older. The median age was 35 years. For every 100 females, there were 88.5 males. For every 100 females age 18 and over, there were 86.4 males.

The median income for a household in the city was $29,306, and the median income for a family was $37,978. Males had a median income of $31,543 versus $21,985 for females. The per capita income for the city was $15,656. About 10.3% of families and 14.9% of the population were below the poverty line, including 17.9% of those under age 18 and 23.8% of those age 65 or over.

Economy

Industry

Lawrenceburg was home to the Tanner's Creek Generating Station, now AEP (Tanner's Creek Generating Station has been demolished).

Lawrenceburg has had a long history with whiskey production, earning the city the nickname Whiskey City, U.S.A. MGP Indiana, formerly Seagram's, operates within Lawrenceburg, and distills various alcoholic spirits.

Another industry located within Lawrenceburg is Anchor Glass Container (formerly Thatcher Glass).

Lawrenceburg is also home to Perfect North Slopes, a ski area located off Route 1. It boasts hills for skiing, snowboarding, and snowing tubing. It has been family owned and operated by the Perfect Family for many years and is open throughout the winter months (weather permitting).

Hollywood Casino Lawrenceburg (formerly Argosy Casino) is found in Lawrenceburg, and is the closest Indiana riverboat casino to downtown Cincinnati.

Education
The Lawrenceburg School District consists of the Lawrenceburg Primary School, Central Elementary, Greendale Middle School, Lawrenceburg Highschool and St. Lawrence Catholic School.

The city has a free lending library, the Lawrenceburg Public Library District. Lawrenceburg residents may also obtain a library card at the Aurora Public Library in Aurora.

Notable people

Henry Ward Beecher, minister and abolitionist, had his first church here in the 1830s.
Henry G. Blasdel, first Governor of Nevada; born near Lawrenceburg.
George P. Buell, Union general during the Civil War.
Winfield T. Durbin, 25th Governor of Indiana; born in Lawrenceburg.
James B. Eads, engineer and inventor; born in Lawrenceburg.
James H. Lane, Union general during the Civil War and U.S. Senator from Kansas; born in Lawrenceburg.
Gunnar Garfors, record-breaking traveler, was an exchange student in Lawrenceburg.
Nick Goepper, freestyle skier for Olympic Team USA, bronze medalist in the first-time slopestyle event, Sochi, 2014, contributing to the third-ever American sweep of the podium in a winter Olympics. Goepper went on to win the silver medal for USA in the 2018 Olympics in PyeongChang and 2022 Olympics in Beijing.
Billy McCool, MLB All-Star pitcher, was raised in Lawrenceburg.
Albert G. Porter, 19th Governor of Indiana from 1881 to 1885.
John Coit Spooner, Wisconsin politician and lawyer, was born in Lawrenceburg.
Alfred Wilson, lumber baron and second husband of Matilda Dodge Wilson, widow of automobile pioneer John Dodge. Together Alfred and Matilda built the Meadowbrook Mansion which today is a national landmark.

See also
 List of cities and towns along the Ohio River
 Whitewater Canal

References

External links
 

 City of Lawrenceburg, Indiana website
 City-Data.com

Cities in Indiana
Indiana populated places on the Ohio River
Cities in Dearborn County, Indiana
County seats in Indiana
1802 establishments in Indiana Territory
Populated places established in 1802